The Turkish Journal of Surgery is a quarterly peer-reviewed open-access medical journal covering all aspects of surgery. It is an official journal of the Turkish Surgical Society and was established in 1991 as Ulusal Cerrahi Dergisi, obtaining its current title in 2017. The editor-in-chief is Kaya Saribeyoğlu.

Abstracting and indexing
The journal is abstracted and indexed in Emerging Sources Citation Index, EBSCO databases, and Scopus.

References

External links

Turkish Surgical Association

Publications established in 1991
Surgery journals
Quarterly journals
English-language journals